List of secondary schools in Mauritius
List of tertiary institutions in Mauritius

See also 
Education in Mauritius

Schools
Mauritius
Schools
Schools
Schools
Mauritius